The Jabal Waqf es Suwwan crater is an impact crater in Ma'an Governorate, Jordan, near the Saudi border.

The crater has a diameter of 5.5 km.  It is estimated at 37–56 million years old.  It is exposed at the surface.

The crater was proposed in 2006 by geologists Elias Salameh and Hani N. Khoury from the University of Jordan, along with German professor Werner Schneider.  The bolide is estimated by Prof. Salameh to have been 100m in diameter, and to have had an impact velocity of 40–50 km/s.

References

 Scientists discover region’s largest meteor crater, The Jordan Times, August 8, 2006
 At Google Earth Community 
 Salameh Elias, Khoury Hani N., Schneider Werner (2006). Jebel Wagf as Suwwna, Jordan: a possible impact crater - a first approach . Z. Dtsch. Ges. Geowiss., Vol.157, No.3, P. 319-325 (Cited at http://omzg.sscc.ru/impact/ab460.html)

Impact craters of Jordan